Tasovac, (Serbian Cyrillic: Тасовац) is a Serbian surname. Notable people with the surname include: 

Ivan Tasovac (1966–2021), Serbian pianist and manager
Predrag Tasovac (1922–2010), Serbian actor

Serbian surnames